Longview School District may refer to:

 Longview Independent School District in Texas, USA
 Longview Public Schools in Washington State, USA

See also
 Longview (disambiguation)